Las Colinas is a mixed-use planned community development in Irving, Texas, part of the Dallas/Fort Worth Metroplex, governed by The Las Colinas Association, a Texas non-profit corporation. Due to its central location between Dallas and Fort Worth and its proximity to Dallas/Fort Worth International Airport and Dallas Love Field airport, Las Colinas has been a focus of corporate and business relocation. It has many corporate office and retail spaces, luxury hotels, townhomes, single-family homes, private country clubs, gated enclaves, urban lofts, parks, landscaped water courses, and its own light-rail transit system.

History
Originally called El Ranchito de Las Colinas ("the Little Ranch of the Hills"), Las Colinas was developed in 1972 by cattle ranching millionaire Ben H. Carpenter. Urban planners were consulted to lay out the entire town, an undertaking that predated later projects in Plano, Allen, and other Dallas suburbs.

During the 1980s building boom, Las Colinas became a popular location for relocating companies and office developers, attracting many corporations, including the global headquarters of four Fortune 500 companies and offices of more than 30 others, such as ExxonMobil, GTE Telephone (now Verizon), Kimberly-Clark and Associates Corp.

In 1985, the first sign of financial trouble appeared at Las Colinas after a real estate market crash. However, another  of office space was built in the late 1990s boom.

Recent 

With  of office space, nearly equivalent to the Dallas CBD,  Las Colinas is home to more than 2,000 companies, including the Fortune 500 global headquarters for Caterpillar Inc.,Commercial Metals, ExxonMobil, Fluor and Kimberly-Clark. Other companies with headquarters in Las Colinas include Mission Foods, Trend Micro and La Quinta Inns and Suites. In 1999. La Quinta announced it would move its headquarters from San Antonio, stating it wanted to be near Dallas/Fort Worth International Airport. It is also the home to The Kidd Kraddick Morning Show and ESPN Dallas. FOX News also tapes from the FOX News Texas Studios in Las Colinas.

Other companies and organizations with headquarters or major offices in Las Colinas include Abbott Laboratories, Accenture, AAA-Texas, AT&T, BlackBerry, The Big 12 Conference and Conference USA Headquarters, TheBlaze, Boy Scouts of America, Citigroup, Cortland Partners, First Choice Power, Flowserve, General Motors Financial, Infor, Microsoft, NEC America, Nexstar Media Group, Nokia, Nokia Siemens Networks, Oracle, Paycom, PLH Group, PNM Resources, Inc., Stellar, TRT Holdings, Inc., Verizon, Vizient, Inc., Westwood One, and Zale Corporation. In 2008 TXU Energy moved offices into the former TM Advertising headquarters in Las Colinas.

Las Colinas also features three private country clubs, including the Las Colinas Country Club owned by ClubCorp, Hackberry Creek Country Club and four championship golf courses surrounded by gated communities.  The TPC Four Seasons Las Colinas Resort  has hosted the HP Byron Nelson Championship of PGA Tour since it opened in 1986. It features tree-lined fairways, large greens and a number of creeks and ponds. However, as the Four Seasons works to develop a high rise in Uptown, it will cease operations at the course, and the TPC will come under new hotel and course management by the end of 2022.

It also contains high-rise office towers, retail centers, upscale residences, apartment complexes, and leisure facilities. Notable attractions include the Mustangs at Las Colinas sculpture and fountain and Las Colinas Flower Clock. The Mustangs of Las Colinas are featured in the courtyard of the Towers at Williams Square, where another ClubCorp Property, La Cima Club, is located. The complex also features a River Walk-styled canal offering gondola cruises, as well as the above-ground Las Colinas APT System. A  tract in Las Colinas is also home to the Irving Convention Center at Las Colinas.

Local schools include Irving Independent School District, Carrollton-Farmers Branch Independent School District, and The Highlands School, a private Catholic PreK through 12 school.  North Hills Preparatory, an Uplift Education charter school is in Las Colinas.  North Hills Preparatory is an International Baccalaureate school and has been ranked as a top 20 school in America by Newsweek.

Glenn Beck's independent news and entertainment television network, TheBlaze, has its largest studio complex based in Las Colinas.

The live music venue, originally known as the Irving Music Factory, was renamed the Toyota Music Factory and opened in September 2017. Additionally, the Live Nation concert venue, The Pavilion, was renamed The Pavilion at Toyota Music Factory, and the VIP Lounge was renamed the Toyota Lounge. The grounds of the Toyota Music Factory feature in total approximately 16 restaurants and bars, including the honky tonk Mama Tried which opened in 2019 and also offers live music.

In January 2022, ExxonMobil stated that it was consolidating and restructuring certain elements of its business, the most prominent being the consolidation of its chemical and refinery sectors. ExxonMobil additionally formalized the creation of a new low-carbon sector, which will handle the company's biofuel and carbon capture ventures. Concurrently, the company announced it would be closing its headquarters in Las Colinas, and moving to its recently-opened campus in the Houston suburb of Spring. The company released its 2021 Q4 Earnings early the next day on February 1, recording a 3-month profit of $8.9 Billion USD, jumping over 80%. ExxonMobil that day additionally announced that both its total debt was now around pre-pandemic levels, and it would begin buying back some of its shares.

Geography

Climate
Las Colinas, as part of Irving and the greater DFW metroplex, is considered to be part of the humid subtropical (cfa) classification according to the Köppen system of climate classification. This means that the summers are very warm and humid with mild winters and variable rainfall year round.

Neighborhoods

 Avalon Square
 Bridges at Las Colinas
 Parkside 
 Cottonwood Valley
 Crest at Las Colinas Station
 Country Club Place
 Enclave at Windsor Ridge
 Estates of Escena
 Fairway Vista
 Fox Glen
 Grand Treviso
 Hackberry Creek
 Hunter's Ridge
 La Villita
 The Lakes of Las Colinas
 Mandalay Place
 Positano
 Quail Run
 Riverside Village
 The Terraces of Las Colinas
 University Hills
 University Park
 Villas of Escena

Other developments
The Las Colinas Entertainment District includes the Irving Convention Center at Las Colinas and the Toyota Music Factory

Arts and culture
 Toyota Music Factory 
 Irving Convention Center at Las Colinas

Parks
 Las Colinas Flower Clock
 Lake Carolyn
 Mandalay Canal
 Mustangs of Las Colinas

Government
The constituent properties of Las Colinas are governed by The Las Colinas Association, a State of Texas non-profit corporation first incorporated on 21 August 1973 by charter 329790. The Las Colinas Association is governed by non-compensated, volunteer board members, with equal representation for residential and commercial properties, and one Declarant representative.

Education
Some portions of Las Colinas are within the Carrollton-Farmers Branch Independent School District. Some residents are zoned to Las Colinas Elementary School. Another portion is zoned to La Villita Elementary School.

Some portions are within the Irving Independent School District.

The Highlands School is a private Catholic Pre-K through 12 college prep school in Las Colinas.

C-FBISD has always served a portion of Irving, and historically children were bussed to schools in Carrollton and Farmers Branch. Las Colinas, which opened in 1986, was C-FBISD's first school in Irving. The Kinwest Corporation donated the tract of land that houses the school. La Villita was C-FBISD's sixth school in Irving and its 27th elementary school.

North Hills Preparatory, an Uplift Education charter school is in Las Colinas. Uplift North Hills Preparatory is a K–12 continuum International Baccalaureate school and has been ranked as a top 20 school in America by Newsweek.

Infrastructure

Transportation

Irving is within the 13 service areas of the Dallas region's transit agency, Dallas Area Rapid Transit (DART). Irving is served by numerous bus routes and the North Irving Transit Center serves Las Colinas with express bus service to downtown Dallas. In July 2012, DART initiated  service to the Las Colinas Urban Center Station and Irving Convention Center Station. On December 3, 2012, North Lake College Station and Belt Line Station opened. The final segment of the Orange line was scheduled to open on December 15, 2014, but the date was changed to August 18, 2014, providing Dallas direct rail service to Dallas/Fort Worth International Airport via Las Colinas.

Las Colinas is also served weekdays between 6 a.m. and 6 p.m. by the Las Colinas APT System, a unique people mover that links the Las Colinas Urban Center's businesses and entertainment areas. A bridge at the DART Las Colinas Urban Center Station connects to the APT.

Like the rest of Dallas-Fort Worth however, the majority of traffic comes via the automobile. Interstate 635 forms the northern border of Las Colinas while Texas state highway 114 cuts through its heart. A portion of the President George Bush Turnpike (Texas state highway 161) cuts through the western side while the southern portion of Las Colinas can be accessed from Texas state highway 183 via feeder roads such as MacArthur Boulevard, Belt Line Road and O’Conner Road.

References

External links

 Irving Convention and Visitors Bureau
 City of Irving, Texas 
 The Las Colinas Association website

Irving, Texas
Dallas–Fort Worth metroplex
Geography of Dallas County, Texas
Populated places established in 1972